Jim Wilson is an American recording artist and piano technician.

Early life
Wilson was born in Greenville, South Carolina. When he was six, he and his family moved to Amarillo, Texas, where he grew up.

Wilson attended Tascosa High School in Amarillo where he was later inducted into its Hall of Fame on March 26, 2007.

Career

Recording career 
Wilson is a Yamaha-endorsed recording artist  of piano-featured instrumentals with 10 recordings released to date. Three of Wilson's albums have appeared on the Billboard Top-20 charts. PBS produced and aired the music special Jim Wilson: A Place in my Heart filmed live in Amarillo, Texas at the Globe-News Center. Wilson was accompanied by artists Eric Rigler and Romina Arena In addition to his work as a solo artist, Wilson has also been the keyboard player and musical director for recording artist Stephen Bishop since October, 2004.

In July, 2020, Wilson teamed up with Arlo Guthrie to release a well received recording of Stephen Foster's moving song "Hard Times Come Again No More". The song debuted on Rolling Stone's website as an editorial article and music video. The record was produced and performed by Wilson on Piano and sung by Guthrie featuring vocalist Vanessa Bryan. The separate pieces of the song and music video were mixed together from remote recordings made by each of the artists.

Piano technician career 
Wilson has been a Registered Piano Technician with the Piano Technicians Guild since 1981. Wilson collaborated with the Burbank, California company, Spectrasonics on the release of "Keyscape", a new “virtual instrument that features the largest selection of unique, collector keyboards in the world” - including Wilson's personal, customized Yamaha C7. Ten years in the making, the library was released on September 1, 2016.

References

External links
 
 LA Piano Services
 Yamaha Artist Jim Wilson
 Jim Wilson Billboard Chart
 Jim Wilson Interview NAMM Oral History Library (2021)

Living people
Musicians from Texas
Year of birth missing (living people)